Christian Ludwig Mayer (born March 21, 1974) is a German pianist and composer. He also appears under the pseudonym of Ludwig Auwald.

Mayer began as an autodidact and studied jazz piano and classical piano with Leonid Chizhik at Richard-Strauss-Konservatorium München, as well as harpsichord and jazz composition. He has worked with Gunther Klatt, Giora Feidman, Marcus Woelfle, and New Orleans based trombonist Dwayne Paulin. He also works frequently with Montauk based violinist Bob Stern.

Partial discography
 1997 Black & White, Dwayne Paulin Quartet, Bauer Studios Ludwigburg-CHAOS
 2004 Cabaret Modern, AudioFilm with Noël Akchoté, Red, Giovanna Cacciola, John Greaves, Jean-Louis Costes, etc., Winter & Winter
 2009 Dedications, MAQ, Michael Ausserbauer Quartett
 2010 Robert Schumann – Von Wilden Reitern und Träumereien, classical music history for children, based on Robert Schumann IGEL-Records, BR-Klassik

References

External links 
 Web presence, biography
 biography
 Derry Journal
 MacCinema
 german biography

1974 births
Swing pianists
Stride pianists
German composers
Living people
German jazz pianists
21st-century pianists